Matteo Guarise (born 15 September 1988) is an Italian pairs figure skater and roller skater. Guarise is the 2008 World champion in pairs roller skating with Sara Venerucci. 

With his former figure skating partner Nicole Della Monica, he is a seven-time Italian national champion (2016–22). The pair have represented Italy at the 2014, 2018 and 2022 Winter Olympics.

With his current partner, Lucrezia Beccari, he is 2023 Italian national bronze medalist.

Personal life 
Guarise became engaged to longtime girlfriend Carolina Moscheni, a former ice dancer, in 2022. They married on New Year's Eve of that year.

Career

In roller skating
Guarise was originally a roller skater and won the 2008 World title with Sara Venerucci. He ended his roller career in 2009 and moved to Milan.

Switch to figure skating
In January 2010, Guarise began training in figure skating. In June 2010, it was reported that he had teamed up with Elena Yarkhunova and was training with her under coach Oleg Vasiliev in Saint Petersburg, Russia and Chicago, Illinois. After their partnership ended, he skated with Kaela Pflumm and Caitlin Yankowskas.

Partnership with Della Monica

2011–12 season

Guarise teamed up with Nicole Della Monica in late November 2011. They train mainly in Zanica. They withdrew after the short program from the 2012 Italian Championships. Della Monica/Guarise made their international debut at the 2012 Bavarian Open, where they won the bronze medal. They were assigned to compete at the 2012 World Championships and finished fifteenth.

2012–13 season
Della Monica/Guarise placed ninth at the 2013 European Championships and then fourteenth at the 2013 World Championships, where Italy secured two berths for the 2014 Olympic pairs event. They also won bronze at the 2013 Winter Universiade.

2013–14 season
After taking silver at the 2014 Italian Championships, they placed eighth at the 2014 European Championships. Della Monica/Guarise were named along with Italian champions Stefania Berton / Ondrej Hotarek as Italy's pairs entries at the 2014 Winter Olympics in Sochi. Just before the event, Guarise tore the medial meniscus in his right knee. The pair finished sixteenth at the Olympics. He then underwent a knee operation and resumed training starting in March.

2014–15 season
In the 2014–15 season, Della Monica/Guarise competed at two Grand Prix events, placing fifth at the 2014 Cup of China and sixth at the 2014 Trophée Éric Bompard. After finishing second to Valentina Marchei / Ondřej Hotárek at the Italian Championships, they came in sixth at the 2015 European Championships in Stockholm, Sweden and fourteenth at the 2015 World Championships in Shanghai, China.

2015–16 season
In the 2015–16 season, Della Monica/Guarise took the bronze medal at the 2015 Ice Challenge, their first ISU Challenger Series (CS) event. After finishing fifth at their sole GP event, the 2015 Trophée Éric Bompard, they appeared at two more CS events, winning silver at the Warsaw Cup and placing sixth at the 2015 Golden Spin of Zagreb. In December 2015, they won their first national title together, edging out Marchei/Hotárek.  They placed sixth at the 2016 European Championships, and then placed eleventh at the 2016 World Championships in Boston, United States.

2016–17 season
The 2016–17 season saw the duo win two Challenger events, the 2016 Lombardia Trophy and 2016 Golden Spin of Zagreb.  They placed sixth at the Skate Canada International and fifth at the Cup of China.  After their second national title, they placed eighth at the 2017 European Championships and then placed thirteenth at the 2017 World Championships in Helsinki, Finland.

2017–18 season
Guarise and his partner began the 2017–18 season with silver medals at Lombardia Trophy and Finlandia Trophy.  Competing again at the Cup of China, they placed fourth.  At the Internationaux de France, they placed third, winning their first Grand Prix bronze medal.  Della Monica pronounced herself "really happy with our performance."  Della Monica/Guarise won their third straight national title, followed by a sixth-place finish at Europeans.  Competing at their second Olympic Games in Pyeongchang, South Korea, they placed tenth.  The season concluded at the 2018 World Championships in Milan, where they placed fifth overall.

2018–19 season
Their 2018–19 season began again at Lombardia Trophy, where they won the bronze medal.  Turning to the Grand Prix series, they won silver at the 2018 Grand Prix of Helsinki.  Della Monica commented, "this is our first silver medal on the Grand Prix.  Last year we won our first medal, a bronze, so we are happy that we improved. Next time it maybe will be gold; who knows? It shows that we are on the right track."  They won a second silver medal at the 2018 Rostelecom Cup, becoming the first Italian pair team to qualify for the Grand Prix Final, a goal they had set for themselves at the beginning of the year.  They placed fifth at the Final, after multiple falls and popped jumps.

After winning their fourth consecutive national title, Della Monica/Guarise competed at the 2019 European Championships.  They placed third in the short program, 0.12 points ahead of Aleksandra Boikova / Dmitrii Kozlovskii of Russia, and were awarded a small bronze medal for the result.  In the free skate, both teams made errors, with Della Monica putting a hand down on their three-jump combination, as a result, finished fourth in the free skate and fourth overall, 0.14 points behind Boikova/Kozlovskii.  Guarise said they were "a little bit disappointed actually because we gave everything we had. It maybe wasn’t 100 percent, but I think it was very good."

At the 2019 World Championships, Guarise collided with French skater Vanessa James in the warmup for the short program, which shook up both skaters.  He then doubled his jump attempt, causing them to place eighth in the short.  In the free skate, the team had multiple errors, finishing seventh there and eighth overall.  Guarise reported that the aftereffects of the collision had been more of a problem than he initially believed.  Della Monica/Guarise concluded the season at the 2019 World Team Trophy as part of Team Italy, which finished sixth out of sixth teams.

2019–20 season
Della Monica dislocated her shoulder during the summer, significantly delaying the team's training.  They returned to competition at the 2019 Icelab International in Italy, taking the silver medal, a week before their first Grand Prix.  At the 2019 Cup of China, they placed fourth.  At the 2019 NHK Trophy, Della Monica/Guarise placed eighth.

After winning the Italian title again, Della Monica/Guarise competed at the 2020 European Championships, placing fourth. They had been assigned to compete at the World Championships in Montreal, but these were cancelled as a result of the coronavirus pandemic.

2020–21 season
Della Monica/Guarise were scheduled to compete on the Grand Prix at the 2020 Internationaux de France, but the event was cancelled due to the pandemic. They placed eighth at the 2021 World Championships in Stockholm. They were later named to the team for the 2021 World Team Trophy. On April 8th, he was named team captain. Finishing the season at the Trophy, they placed second in the short program and fourth in the free skate, while Team Italy finished in fourth place overall.

2021–22 season
Della Monica/Guarise began the season on home soil at the Lombardia Trophy, where they won the gold medal. They were initially assigned to the 2021 Cup of China as their first Grand Prix of the season, but following the event's cancellation, they were reassigned to a special home 2021 Gran Premio d'Italia, hosted in Turin. They placed third in the free skate despite both falling on their side-by-side jumps, but were fourth in the free skate with several errors and dropped to fourth place overall. Guarise acknowledged " today was hard physically and mentally," which he said did not reflect their training. They were seventh at the 2021 Rostelecom Cup. Della Monica said afterward that she intended to retire at the end of the season to start a family, while Guarise expressed a desire to continue, joking, "maybe she can be my coach one day."

After winning the gold medal at the Italian championships again, Della Monica/Guarise were named to the Italian Olympic team and withdrew from the 2022 European Championships as a precautionary measure after a fall in training.

Della Monica/Guarise began the 2022 Winter Olympics as the Italian entries in the pairs' short program of the Olympic team event, where they placed seventh of nine teams, earning four points for Team Italy. Team Italy did not advance to the second stage of the competition and finished seventh. In the pairs event, they placed tenth in the short program after Della Monica fell on her jump attempt. In the free skate, they dropped to thirteenth.

Partnership with Beccari

2022–23 season
Della Monica decided to retire following the Beijing Olympics, but Guarise opted to continue skating with an eye to competing at the 2026 Winter Olympics, to be held in Italy in Milan and Cortina d'Ampezzo. To that end, he quickly formed a new partnership with former singles skater Lucrezia Beccari.

Beccari/Guarise made their international debut at the 2022 CS Warsaw Cup, finishing in fourth place. They won the bronze medal at their first Italian championships, and were seventh at the 2023 European Championships.

Programs 
(with Beccari)

(with Della Monica)

Competitive highlights 
GP: Grand Prix; CS: Challenger Series

 With Beccari

 With Della Monica

References

External links 

 
 

1988 births
Italian male pair skaters
Italian roller skaters
Living people
Sportspeople from Rimini
Figure skaters at the 2014 Winter Olympics
Figure skaters at the 2018 Winter Olympics
Figure skaters at the 2022 Winter Olympics
Olympic figure skaters of Italy
Universiade medalists in figure skating
Universiade bronze medalists for Italy
Competitors at the 2013 Winter Universiade